O. portoricensis may refer to:

 Ocotea portoricensis, a flowering plant
 Ophionectria portoricensis, a sac fungus